FC Tbilisi was a Georgian football team based in the capital Tbilisi. The club played their home games at Olimpi Stadium. FC Tbilisi were renamed Olimpi Rustavi after merging with second division club Rustavi.

In the summer of 2008, the two clubs split up again. Tbilisi took the spot from Olimpi B Rustavi and continued to play in Pirveli Liga.

History
Founded as FC Olimpi Tbilisi
2003: Merged with Merani-91 Tbilisi, as Merani-Olimpi Tbilisi
2003: Renamed as FC Tbilisi
2006: Merged with Rustavi, Renamed as Olimpi Rustavi.
2008: Split up.

Seasons

First Team
2002–03: Olimpi Tbilisi Regionuli Liga
2003–04: FC Tbilisi Umaglesi Liga
2004–05: FC Tbilisi Umaglesi Liga
2005–06: FC Tbilisi Umaglesi Liga
2006–08: part of Olimpi Rustavi
2008–09: FC Tbilisi Pirveli Liga

{|class="wikitable"
|-bgcolor="#efefef"
! Season
! League
! Pos.
! Pl.
! W
! D
! L
! GF
! GA
! P
!Cup
!Europe
!Notes
!    Manager
|-
|rowspan=2|2003/04
|Umaglesi Liga 1st stage
|align=right|4
|align=right|22 ||align=right|10 ||align=right|5 ||align=right|7
|align=right|41 ||align=right|26 ||align=right|35
|rowspan=2|Quarter-finals
|
|rowspan=2|FC Tbilisi
|
|-
|Champ.Group
|align=right|4
|align=right|10 ||align=right|3 ||align=right|5 ||align=right|2
|align=right|12 ||align=right|8 ||align=right|32
|
|
|-
|2004/05
|Umaglesi Liga
|align=right bgcolor=cc9966|3
|align=right|36||align=right|21||align=right|6||align=right|9
|align=right|60||align=right|40||align=right|69
|bgcolor=cc9966|Semi-finals
|UC 2nd qualifying round
|FC Tbilisi
|
|-
|}

Second Team

2003–04: Olimpi Tbilisi Pirveli Liga
2004–05: Olimpi Tbilisi Pirveli Liga
2005–06: FC Tbilisi B Pirveli Liga
2006–07: Olimpi Tbilisi Pirveli Liga
2007–08: Olimpi B Rustavi Pirveli Liga

Third Team
2004–05: FC Tbilisi C Regionuli Liga
2006–07: FC Tbilisi Regionuli Liga

Eurocups record

Notable players

 Akaki Devadze (2004–05)

 Zaal Eliava

 Soso Grishikashvili (2004)

 Gogita Gogua (2003–05)

 Sandro Iashvili (2004–05)

 Lasha Jakobia (2003)

 Revaz Kemoklidze

 Gocha Khojava

 Givi Kvaratskhelia

Honours
 Umaglesi Liga
 Third place (1): 2004-05

References

External links
Official Web Site

Tbilisi
FC Tbilisi
Association football clubs established in 1991
1991 establishments in Georgia (country)
Association football clubs disestablished in 2008
2008 disestablishments in Georgia (country)
Defunct football clubs in Georgia (country)